Ainak Wala Jin (English: Spectacled Genie) is Pakistani children's television series produced and broadcast by PTV Lahore from 1993–1996. This drama was rebroadcast two times on television in Pakistan due to public demand. It was widely popular among children for its humour and fictional storyline.

Plot 
The theme was conceived by Hafeez Tahir as an amalgamation of fantasy, real life and science fiction. A genie is sent by the emperor of genies from the Caucasus Mountains to Earth for the treatment of his eyesight problems. When he lands, he happens to meet a daring young boy who loves fantasies. The boy takes him to the doctor who prescribes power glasses. Then the boy, along with his father, takes the genie home. The genie is in the shape of a tall handsome man with the special features of a genie on his face. He starts living with humans and the interesting interaction starts. He meets magicians, witches, other genies, space people and real-life characters. These interactions give birth to a very interesting story line which entailed comedy, magic, morals and learning for children and adults.

Cast 
The main actors of this drama are:
 Shehzad Qaiser as Nastoor
 Haseeb Pasha as Hamoon Jadoogar
 Sehrish Khan as mother (Farkhanda)
 Munna Lahori as Zakoota Jin
 Ghayyur Akhtar as Samari Jadugar
 Ajlal Asim Bukhari as Imran
 Moattar Asim Bukhari (now Moattar Adeel) as Moattar
 Zahid Sharif as jin
 Nusrat Ara as Bil Batori
 Farooq Butt as 'space chief'
 Aneel Chaudhri as Ashkali
 Arifa Siddiqui as Fairy
 Fariha Pervez as Aini
 Humera Arshad as Toofani Nagan
 Shabnam Majeed as Baaji
 Nabeel Ahmad Goheer as Father
 Asad Bhandara as Charlie Mamun
 Mukhtar Ahmad Shaad as Rehmu Baba
 Nisar Butt as Umro Ayyar
 Humza Ghayyur Akhtar as dubi
 Hamza Bin Tahir as son of Nastoor
 Jamil Fakhri as Taloos Badshah or Shah Taloos
 Honey Albela  as 'Taya Abba'
 Umar Daraz Khalil as Aamlee jadugar
 Rashid Mehmood as 'Sarkata Insaan'
 Najma as 'Karnani Churail'
 Babu Baral (comedian) as (guest appearance) JIN
 Jamal Pasha as 'chotta Jin'

Note: It should be mentioned here that three famous female singers of Pakistan started their career as actresses with this TV serial. They are Shabnam Majeed, Fariha Pervez, and Humera Arshad.

Production

Story 
The serial was written by Late Abdul Hameed who is popularly known as A Hameed. He has written about two hundred books, innumerable columns, memoirs, novels, fiction for children and many serials for the Pakistani television. His TV serials included Dachi, Alif Liala (many episodes), Ambar Naag Maria and AINAK WALA JIN. The last one surpassed his other works in popularity.

Direction 
This TV serial was directed by Hafeez Tahir, a versatile director of Pakistan Television. He was given producer of the decade award for this production by PTV. Having two master's degrees from  University of Punjab, he was trained in television production and direction at MMTC Indonesia and PTV Academy. He is a poet, short story writer, newspaper column writer and a still photographer. He has three publications to his credit, "Aathwan Rang", "Zere Zamin" and his latest to date "Manzil Manzil"

Special effects 
In the absence of computer graphics facility, the director of the show Hafeez Tahir managed to create many special effects with the simple chroma key technique. Some ingenious techniques were invented to make those effects with the help of able lighting cameramen and his technical crew. Many layers were created and matted to create imaginative video effects.

Popularity 
This play has been immensely popular among the children and adults at the same time. The children, their parents and their elders enjoyed it together.  The characters became household names and some of the dialogues were transformed into political connotations. The team of the play had been invited by many educational institutions and dignitaries like the Governor of Punjab, Pakistan, Khalid Maqbool to request a live performance for them.

The team was also invited by Imran Khan, the legendary cricketer  turned politician, for fund raising of his Shaukat Khanum Memorial Cancer Hospital & Research Centre and, in this connection, the entire play team along with the play director Hafeez Tahir, had the honour of performing before Princess Diana, Princess of Wales and Imran Khan. The team including Hamoon Jadugar, Zakoota Jin, Bill Batori, Hafeez Tahir and some other actors visited 2005 Kashmir earthquake-affected areas with the President of Pakistan to bring back smiles on the faces of mentally stressed children. The team visited the areas on a special helicopter. The play team also performed a magical comedy skit on Eid Night live transmission from there.

The play has also been presented on stage at Alhamra Arts Council, Lahore, Pakistan.

Sequel 
The play was returned with a sequel 'Ainak Wala Jin 2'.

See also 
 Pakistan Television Corporation
 List of television programmes broadcast by PTV

References 

Urdu-language television shows
Pakistani drama television series
Pakistan Television Corporation original programming
Pakistani comedy television series
Pakistani children's television series
1993 Pakistani television series debuts
1996 Pakistani television series endings
1990s Pakistani television series
Urdu comedy shows